By Design is a 1982 Canadian comedy-drama film directed by Claude Jutra and starring Sara Botsford and Patty Duke. The film was produced by B.D.F. Productions, Canadian Film Development Corporation (CFDC), Fox Productions, and Seven Arts.

Synopsis
Angie and Helen are in love and they live and work together - they design women's clothes and run their own fashion business in Vancouver. Helen wants to be a mother. Angie loves Helen and if Helen can't feel fulfilled without a child she is willing for them to become parents. When Helen announces she wants to have a child, Angie reluctantly agrees to support her. The only obstacle seems to be the physical factor, at first, an idea of artificial insemination came to their mind. However, "They then quickly reject the idea of artificial insemination when they see an unkempt drunk emerging from the cubicle where he has donated sperm for beer money." "Denied permission to adopt, and rejecting artificial insemination, the couple set their sights on sleazy photographer, Terry, as a potential one-night stand for Helen." At the end of the film, Angie gives birth to a girl, while Suzie and Terry move to Los Angeles to promote their new design.

Cast

Development 

While Jutra was directing this movie, he received an offer by Beryl Fox to direct the movie Surfacing. Initially rejected this offer, he changed his mind until "Fox agreed to produce By Design as well. Although a script existed before Jutra became involved with the project, he was able to rewrite it thoroughly in collaboration with playwright Joe Wiesenfeld."

Reception
The film was favourably reviewed by the critic Pauline Kael in The New Yorker : "  a buoyant, quirky sex comedy..the director takes a look around the whole modern supermarket of sex. By Design takes in the bars and beach houses, fast food restaurants and discos, and the sexual patterns of those who inhabit them..Jutra has a light understated approach to farce. His sensibility suggests a mingling of Tati and Truffaut. The scenes are quick and they're dippy, but with a pensive, melancholy underlay."

Philip Szporer of The Cinema Canada journal published a film review in January 1983, stated that the film by design cannot be appreciated as a whole due to lack of vibrancy and clarity. "It never picks up a stride, and its ambivalence in direction, where Jutra wants it to go, is the film's most serious problem." Such problem could be found in the details of the movie, like "the punk titles and raucous soundtrack of the opening do not mix with a later scene in which the camera moves aimlessly in the darkness, finally entering a cabin bathed in golden light, where the two lovers talk about conceiving a baby." That rapid shift in mood and distinct contrast in scenes made this film less coherent and indistinct. According to Szporer, "Any intelligent development in the storyline is often overrun by an insensitive scene which follows, or the introduction of a character who appears for one brief scene, never to be seen on screen again. It is impossible to discernt the filmmaker's intent - as if Jutra himself was unsure of what he wanted to fashion with this film. Nor does he seem to recognize his own uncertainty of vision." The film mainly portrayed the story of two women fashion designer lover. while they were working, the shots of the fashion models and they walk down the runway were inevitable appeared in this movie. However, behind these shots, a belief is formulated and conveyed to the audience that these women have no feelings; and "reinforced in that even the designers' creations which the models are exhibiting have no flair, no meaning." Even though the words of this film were banal, scenes contained certain vulgar, and lack of good pacing. But at the end of the journal, Szporer concluded that "If the film was to have been a bold, inventive, humorous and touching tale, it is instead a completely forgettable experience. Lacking a coherent structure and tone, the film only serves up a mish-mash of moral overtones and misgivings."

Awards
All four of the film's stars received Genie Award nominations at the 4th Genie Awards: Rubinek as Best Actor, Botsford as Best Actress, Coulter as Best Supporting Actress and Astin as Foreign Actress.

References

External links
 

1982 films
1982 comedy-drama films
Atlantic Entertainment Group films
Canadian comedy-drama films
Canadian LGBT-related films
English-language Canadian films
1980s English-language films
Films directed by Claude Jutra
Films scored by Chico Hamilton
Films set in Vancouver
Films shot in Vancouver
Lesbian-related films
1982 comedy films
1982 drama films
1982 LGBT-related films
LGBT-related comedy-drama films
1980s Canadian films